Neil Carmichael  may refer to:
 Neil Carmichael, Baron Carmichael of Kelvingrove (1921–2001), British Labour Party politician, Member of Parliament (MP) in Glasgow 1962–1983
 Neil Carmichael (English politician) (born 1961), English businessman, academic, and MP for Stroud from 2010